"Turn It Around" is a song by British DJ and record producer Sub Focus, featuring vocals from Bloc Party's lead singer Kele Okereke (credited as Kele on the release). It was released as the fifth single from Sub Focus' second studio album Torus on 22 September 2013, through Virgin EMI Records, Mercury Records and RAM Records.

Music video
A music video to accompany the release of "Turn It Around" was first released onto YouTube on 28 August 2013 at a total length of three minutes and thirty-two seconds. The video, which was filmed in various locations in Japan, tells the story of a girl who hates the technology around her, so she escapes city life by discovering nature and "turns her life around".

Track listing

Chart performance

Weekly charts

Release history

References

2013 singles
Sub Focus songs
Kele Okereke songs
Mercury Records singles
RAM Records singles
2013 songs
Songs written by Sub Focus
Songs written by Kele Okereke